Chaudhry Muhammad Akram is a Pakistani politician who was a Member of the Provincial Assembly of the Punjab, from December 2012 to May 2018.

Early life and education
He was born on 1 April 1950 in Sialkot.

He has received Matriculation education.

Political career
He is PMLN Sialkot City President for more than 10 years and still holds the position.

He was elected to the Provincial Assembly of the Punjab as a candidate of Pakistan Muslim League (Nawaz) (PML-N) from Constituency PP-122 (Sialkot-II) in by-polls held in December 2012. He received 27,291 votes and defeated a candidate of Pakistan Peoples Party.

He was re-elected to the Provincial Assembly of the Punjab as a candidate of PML-N from Constituency PP-122 (Sialkot-II) in 2013 Pakistani general election. He received 43,167 votes and defeated Mir Umer Farooq Meyer, a candidate of Pakistan Tehreek-e-Insaf (PTI).

References

Living people
Punjab MPAs 2013–2018
1950 births
Pakistan Muslim League (N) politicians
Punjab MPAs 2008–2013